True Colors is a personality profiling system created by Don Lowry in 1978. It was originally created to categorize at risk youth into four basic learning styles using the colors blue, orange, gold and green to identify the strengths and challenges of these core personality types.

Personality profiling system 
According to this personality temperament theory, which is a refined version of the popular Myers–Briggs Type Indicator (MBTI), everyone's personality consists of a combination of all four colors, with the dominant two colors representing the core of a person's personality temperament. In general, green personality types are independent thinkers, gold personality types are pragmatic planners, orange personality types are very action-oriented, and blue personality types are very people-oriented. The idea behind True Colors is that it does not pigeonhole people into one personality type over another with the understanding that one's personality might make adjustments based on his or her environment or associations. True Colors is a way to understand the behaviors and motivations of others relative to our own personalities to help mitigate potential conflict by learning to recognize personality differences and characteristics.

Scientific basis 
Results from the correlations of a 2006 study of the True Colors system (Wichard, 2006), show that True Colors has convergent validity with the MBTI. Convergent validity is when a measure is more strongly associated with measures of similar constructs. However, True Colors did not have convergent validity with the Strong Interest Inventory (SII), or the Campbell Interest and Skill Survey (CISS). Furthermore, subjects rated the predictions that the True Colors system made about them as accurate.  However, this could be the result of hindsight bias and/or confirmation bias. Subjects retested after a 30 to 50 day delay were given the same classification ~95% of the time.

However, the research was performed by an 11-year True Colors Certified Trainer, the research was not published in a peer-reviewed journal, and there are no published replications.

References 

Personality typologies